WRHQ (105.3 MHz) is a commercial FM radio station licensed to Richmond Hill, Georgia and serving the Savannah metropolitan area. It is owned by Thoroughbred Communications and airs an adult album alternative radio format.  WRHQ's studios are located in Midtown Savannah south of Daffin Park, and its transmitter site is southwest of historic downtown.

WRHQ calls its sound "Quality Rock," a mix of classic rock, alternative rock, adult contemporary, classic hits and other genres.  It is the only station in the Savannah radio market that is locally owned and operated. WRHQ General Manager Jerry Rogers, a Savannah radio veteran for more than 50 years, owns the station.  The Operations Manager / Program Director is Tripp Rogers.

History
After WLOW-FM (now WRWN) moved to 107.9 from 105.5, a vacant allotment was created at 105.3 MHz for Richmond Hill, a suburban community about 15 miles southwest of Savannah. On May 13, 1991, WRHQ signed on the air.  At first, it was powered at 3,000 watts, put on the air by its current owner, Thoroughbred Broadcasting.

In the late 1990s, WRHQ's power was boosted to its current 11,000 watts.  WRHQ has remained an adult album alternative/Rock AC hybrid for more than a quarter century.

Current On-Air Staff
 5:30am-10am - Brady McGraw
 10am-3pm - Lyndy Brannen
 3pm-7pm - Jerry Rogers
 7pm-12am - Renee Kennedy

Weekends - Angela Snipes, Marguerite Springfield, Chris Sinclair, Sandy Anthony, Michelle Heyman, Tripp Rogers

See also
List of radio stations in Georgia (U.S. state)
Georgia (U.S. state)
Lists of radio stations in North and Central America

References

External links

RHQ